Dragojla Jarnević (also spelled Jarnjević), (4 January 1812 in Karlovac – 12 March 1875 in Karlovac) 12 was a Croatian poet and teacher. She became a member of the Illyrian movement, being most famous for writing of women's rights issues. She is also known for being an early mountaineer and rock-climber, famous for scaling the rock of Okić (stijena Okića).

References
 Francisca de Haan, Krasimira Daskalova & Anna Loutfi: Biographical Dictionary of Women's Movements and Feminisms in Central, Easterna and South Eastern Europe, 19th and 20th centuries Central European University Press, 2006

1813 births
1875 deaths
Croatian women poets
Croatian women writers
19th-century Croatian women writers
People from Karlovac
Croatian mountain climbers
19th-century Croatian people
Croatian women's rights activists
19th-century Croatian poets